The men's 5000 metres was a track and field athletics event held as part of the Athletics at the 1912 Summer Olympics programme.  It was the debut of the event, which along with the 10000 metre event replaced the 5 mile race held at the 1908 Summer Olympics. The competition was held on Tuesday, July 9, 1912, and on Wednesday, July 10, 1912. Thirty-one long distance runners from eleven nations competed. NOCs could enter up to 12 athletes.

Records

These were the standing world and Olympic records (in minutes) prior to the 1912 Summer Olympics.

(*) unofficial

George Bonhag, in winning the first semifinal, which was the first Olympic 5000 ever, set the Olympic record at 15:22.6.  It lasted until the 5th and last semifinal, in which Jean Bouin broke it by finishing in 15:05.0.  Unsurprisingly, that record stood only until the next race—Hannes Kolehmainen won the final at 14:36.6 as both he and Bouin (just behind Kolehmainen, at 14:36.7) surpassed the best time of the semifinals. This record became the first official world record for the 5000 metres.

Results

Semifinals

All semi-finals were held on Tuesday, July 9, 1912.

Semifinal 1

Semifinal 2

Semifinal 3

Semifinal 4

Semifinal 5

Final

The final was held on Wednesday, July 10, 1912.

References

Notes
 
 

5000 metres
5000 metres at the Olympics